Paphiopedilum subgenus Parvisepalum is a subgenus of the genus Paphiopedilum.

Distribution
Plants from this section are found from western China down to northern Vietnam.

Species
Paphiopedilum subgenus Parvisepalum comprises the following species:

References

Orchid subgenera